De Drie Waaien is a tower mill in Afferden, Gelderland, Netherlands which was built in 1869 and is in working order. The mill is listed as a Rijksmonument.

History
The first mill on the site was a post mill that was built between 1832 and 1850. It was blown down in a storm in 1868. De Drie Waaien was built in 1869. In 1932, the sails were fitted with the Dekker system on their leading edges. It was the first mill in Gelderland with this feature. The nill was restored in 1965. New sails were fitted that were constructed to the traditional Dutch design. A further restoration was undertaken in 1996. The mill is owned by the Gemeente Druten. It is listed as a Rijksmonument, No. 14155.

Description

De Drie Waaien is what the Dutch describe as a "Ronde stellingmolen". The cap is thatched. The mill is winded by tailpole and winch. The sails are Common sails. The sails are carried on a cast-iron windshaft. The windshaft also carries the brake wheel which has 51 teeth. This drives the lantern pinion wallower (21 staves) at  the top of the wooden upright shaft. At the bottom of the upright shaft is the wooden great spur wheel, which has 56 cogs. The great spur wheel drives a pair of  Cullen millstones and a pair of  French Burr millstones via lantern pinion stone nuts which have 20 staves each.

Public access
De Drie Waaien is open to the public by appointment.

References

Windmills in Gelderland
Windmills completed in 1869
Tower mills in the Netherlands
Grinding mills in the Netherlands
Agricultural buildings in the Netherlands
Rijksmonuments in Gelderland
1869 establishments in the Netherlands
19th-century architecture in the Netherlands